An air gunner or aerial gunner is a member of a military aircrew who operates flexible-mount or turret-mounted machine guns or autocannons in an aircraft. Modern aircraft weapons are usually operated automatically without the need for a dedicated air gunner, but older generation (World War II and earlier) bombers used to carry up to eight air gunners.

Most modern air gunners are helicopter door gunners, who typically have other primary roles such as crew chief or observer in addition to their air gunner role.  Others fly as members of aircrews on gunships, where their duties may include loading guns or manually firing them if computer systems fail.

See also 

 Aircrew (Flight crew)
 Door gunner
 Tail gunner
 Nose gunner
 Gunner Badge

Military aviation occupations
Combat occupations